Individuals from a variety of cultural or philosophical standpoints produced prolific Mormon-themed research, scholarship, or their popularization, in an era now past. Then, beginning in the decade of the 2000s, Mormon studies finally came into its own as an independent field of study when the sub-discipline became featured by then at a few academic institutions in the Western United States.

Some of the individuals with recognized expertise in the field are listed below. In consideration of space, members of Latter Day Saint movement denominations' overall leadership are not included (Dallin H. Oaks is listed for work he published prior his becoming a member of the LDS Church's Quorum of the Twelve).

Selected list of past scholars

19th-century compilers of Mormon histories or essays 
 Thomas Bullock (1816–1885)
 William Clayton (1814–1879)
 Appleton Milo Harmon (1820–1877)
 Edward Tullidge (1829–1894)
 L. John Nuttall (1834–1905)
 Edward H. Anderson (1858–1928) — Journalist. Biographer of Brigham Young
 Nephi Anderson (1865–1923) — Mormon author of fiction and non-fiction

Opening "modern," 20th-century field 
 Andrew Jenson (1850–1941) — Assistant Church Historian of the LDS Church
 B. H. Roberts (1857–1933) — Assistant Church Historian of the LDS Church 1902–1933. Made first attempts to shift from apologetics to a professional historical approach.
 John Henry Evans (1872–1947): Latter-day Saints University — Biographer, various early LDS leaders
 LeRoy R. Hafen (1893–1985): University of Denver; BYU
 Bernard DeVoto (1897–1955): Northwestern; Harvard — Preeminent writer-historian of the American West sometimes writing on Mormon subjects
 Juanita Brooks (1898–1989) — Independent. Also served as a dean at Dixie Junior College
 Paul Dayton Bailey (1906–1987) — Journalist. Author of histories of about Mormon pioneers
 Samuel W. Taylor (1907–1997) — Novelist and screenwriter who authored the Mormon-themed humorous novel Heaven Knows Why! in 1948
 Lowell L. Bennion (1908–1996): Salt Lake City's LDS Institute of Religion — Sociology of religion. Ecumenical outreach, practical philosophy
 Wallace Stegner (1909–1993): University of Wisconsin; Harvard — Writer-historian called "The Dean of Western Writers," sometimes writing on Mormon topics
 Ivan J. Barrett (1910–1999): BYU
 Hugh Nibley (1910–2005): BYU — Known as the father of LDS Apologetics
 W. Cleon Skousen (1913–2006) — BYU religion professor, 1967–1978. Prolific popularizer among LDS of its theology. (Also an influential, conservative American Constitutionalist and faith-based political theorist)
 Dale Morgan (1914–1971) — Influential independent Utah historian
 Fawn Brodie (1915–1981) — Critical, psychobiographer of Joseph Smith. Became UCLA professor
 Leonard J. Arrington (1917–1999): Utah State Agricultural College; BYU; LDS Church Historian, 1972–1982 — Economist, known as the "Dean of Mormon History" and "the Father of Mormon History."
 Richard D. Poll (1918–1994): BYU; Western Illinois University
 Paul R. Cheesman (1921–1991): BYU — Archeologist
 Stanley B. Kimball (1926–2003): Southern Illinois University — Scholar of Eastern European history and also of Utah pioneer history
 Truman G. Madsen (1926–2009): BYU — Homiletic biographer of Joseph Smith, Jr.
 Wesley P. Walters (1926-1990): Critical, researcher into early origins of the Latter Day Saint movement
 Harold Schindler (1929–1998) — Utah journalist. Biographer of Orrin Porter Rockwell
 Carlfred Broderick (1932–1999): University of Southern California — Psychologist, family therapist and popular author. Also wrote a handful of pieces in publications intended for an LDS audience
 Helen B. Andelin (1932–2006): LDS Relief Society — Popular author. Studied home economics at BYU. Taught women's classes in her local LDS Church, expanding materials prepared for this purpose into Fascinating Womanhood (1963)
 Eugene England (1933–2001): BYU — Founder of Dialogue: A Journal of Mormon Thought Valeen Tippetts Avery (1936–2006): Northern Arizona University — Historian specializing in women's studies. Biographer of Emma Hale Smith
 Jerald Tanner (1938–2006) — Independent, evangelical pamphleteer and provocateur who, with his wife Sandra (born 1941), documented such things as what he believed to be historical LDS doctrinal changes
 William Robert Wright (1935-2012): Lawyer; biographer of David O. McKay
 Stanford Cazier (1930-2013): California State University, Chico; Utah State University
 Marvin S. Hill (1928-2016): BYU; Yale
 Robert V. Remini (1921-2013): University of Illinois at Chicago — Biographer of a number of notable Americans, including Joseph Smith, Jr.

 Selected list of current scholars 

 Of preeminence 

 Thomas G. Alexander: BYU professor emeritus — Lemuel Hardison Redd, Jr. Professor of Western History
 James B. Allen: BYU professor emeritus; Assistant (LDS) Church Historian — Co-founder, Mormon History Association
 Philip Barlow: associate director of the Neal A. Maxwell Institute for Religious Scholarship 
 Richard Bushman: Columbia professor emeritus; retired director of Mormon studies at Claremont Graduate University
 Douglas J. Davies: Professor; University of Durham
 Ronald K. Esplin: BYU — former director of the Joseph Fielding Smith Institute for Latter-day Saint History; LDS Church History Library — Managing editor of The Joseph Smith Papers project
 Kathleen Flake: University of Virginia — Richard L. Bushman Professor in Mormon Studies; Vanderbilt — Associate Professor or American Religious History
 Terryl Givens: University of Richmond — Bostwick Professor of English
 Marlin K. Jensen: previous LDS Church Historian/Recorder
 Patrick Q. Mason: Utah State University — Leonard J. Arrington Chair of Mormon History and Culture
 Dean L. May: University of Utah — Professor of American History, Editor of the Journal of Mormon History (1982–1985), President of Mormon History Association (2002)
 Matthew B. Bowman: Claremont Graduate University — Howard W. Hunter Chair of Mormon Studies
 Paul Reeve: University of Utah — Simmons Professor of Mormon Studies
 Armand Mauss: Washington State University — professor emeritus; Claremont Graduate University — visiting scholar
 D. Michael Quinn: Former researcher in Church Historical Department; BYU; after 1988, independent
 Jan Shipps: Indiana University – Purdue University Indianapolis — retired in 1995; Polis Center (Indiana University) — research associate
 Ronald W. Walker: BYU professor emeritus; after 2012, independent

 By interdisciplines 
 International Mormonism 
 R. Lanier Britsch: BYU — retired Historian of LDS missionary work, especially in the South Pacific

 English professors; journalists 
 Will Bagley: Independent historian of Utah history
 Richard Dutcher: Filmmaker on predominantly LDS topics
 John C. Hamer: Independent historian — Journal editor; Co-author, books about Community of Christ history and about LDS movement schisms; Blogger
 William P. MacKinnon: Independent historian — Businessman. Historian of the Utah War
 Adam S. Miller: Collin College — Writer of religious criticism and interpretation and also of LDS lay theology
 Boyd Jay Petersen: BYU — Biographer of Hugh Nibley; Utah Valley University — Literature of the Sacred and Mormon Literature professor; editor of Dialogue: A Journal of Mormon Thought starting 2016; past president of the Association for Mormon Letters
 Levi S. Peterson: Weber State University — English professor emeritus; novelist and memoirist; biographer of Juanita Brooks; editor of Dialogue (2004-2008)
 Gregory A. Prince: Independent historian — medical pathologist; biographer of David O. McKay
 Robert A. Rees: University of California, Los Angeles — retired professor; University of California at Santa Cruz — retired Fulbright professor; Graduate Theological Union in Berkeley — visiting professor
 Jana Riess: Religion reporter and publishing house editor
 Peggy Fletcher Stack: Religion reporter at the Salt Lake Tribune since 1991
 Jonathan A. Stapley: Independent historian — chemist and businessman
 Margaret Blair Young: BYU — Mormon African American history

 Philosophers 

 David L. Paulsen: BYU — professor of philosophy; founding board member of the Society for Mormon Philosophy and Theology
 Kelli D. Potter: UVU — professor of philosophy; founding board member of the Society for Mormon Philosophy and Theology; founding editor of Element: The Journal for the Society for Mormon Philosophy and Theology, 2000-2002.

 Trained historians 
 Mark Ashurst-McGee: BYU; LDS Church History Department
 Alexander L. Baugh: BYU — professor in Church History department; board member of the Mormon History Association
 John L. Brooke: Ohio State University — director of the Center for Historical Research; author of The Refiner's Fire: The Making of Mormon Cosmology, 1644-1844 Richard O. Cowan: BYU — professor of Church history and doctrine
 Reed C. Durham: LDS Institutes of Religion
 Scott H. Faulring: BYU — research historian with the Joseph Fielding Smith Institute for Church History
 Arnold K. Garr: BYU — professor emeritus of Church history and doctrine; lead editor, Encyclopedia of Latter-day Saint History (2000)
 Matthew J. Grow: Church History Department
 William G. Hartley: LDS Church History Department; BYU — previous research historian for the Joseph Fielding Smith Institute for Church History
 Andrew H. Hedges: BYU — co-editor of The Joseph Smith Papers and previous associate professor of Church history and doctrine
 Daniel Walker Howe: Oxford — Professor of America History Emeritus; University of California, Los Angeles — Professor of History Emeritus; author of What Hath God Wrought: the Transformation of America, 1815–1848 (2007)
 Richard L. Jensen: BYU; LDS Church History Department — 19th-century European Mormonism; LDS converts' immigration to U.S.
 Dean C. Jessee: LDS Church History Department; BYU — worked at the Joseph Fielding Smith Institute for Latter-day Saint History; general editor of The Joseph Smith Papers Glen M. Leonard: BYU; Utah State University
 L. Jackson Newell: University of Utah — Professor Emeritus of Educational Leadership and Policy; Deep Springs College — President Emeritus
 Richard E. Turley, Jr.: Assistant Church Historian of the LDS Church
 Grant Underwood: BYU — professor of history
 Dan Vogel: Independent historian — Biographer of Joseph Smith, Jr.
 David J. Whittaker: BYU — Joseph Smith Papers Project, professor of history, and curator of Western and Mormon history manuscripts; LDS Church History Department

 Specialists in women's studies 

 Lavina Fielding Anderson: Independent historian — Feminist. Among the September Six, scholars involved in a 1993 LDS controversy
 Claudia Bushman: Columbia — professor American Studies emerita; Claremont Graduate University — Mormon studies program from 2008 to 2011; Historian
 Kathryn M. Daynes: BYU — assistant professor in the Department of History; published on polygamy
 Jill Mulvay Derr: retired senior research historian for the Church History Department.
 Kristine Haglund — Mormon-themed blogger. Editor of Dialogue: A Journal of Mormon Thought (2009-2015)
 Carol Cornwall Madsen: BYU — emerita research historian with the Joseph Fielding Smith Institute for Church history and associate director of Women's Research Institute
 Margaret Merrill Toscano: University of Utah — Director of graduate studies, and associate professor of world languages and cultures
 Laurel Thatcher Ulrich: Harvard; Preeminent historian of early American women's history. Also, occasional essayist on the topic of LDS feminism

 Other specialists 
 David H. Bailey: Lawrence Berkeley National Laboratory — Mathematician. Editor, Science Meets Religion website
 Robert H. Briggs: Lawyer. Violence in pioneer Utah
 John E. Clark: BYU — Archaeologist. Book of Mormon studies
 Todd M. Compton: Independent historian — Trained classicist
 James E. Faulconer: BYU — Department of Philosophy and holds BYU's Richard L. Evans Chair of Religious Understanding
 Russell Arben Fox: Friends University — Political scientist. Blogger and essayist on LDS-related themes
 Avraham Gileadi: BYU; after 1993, independent — Hebraist. LDS apologtics, theological research
 Darius Gray: Independent historian — African-American studies
 Danny Jorgensen: University of South Florida — Religious studies
 Bradley H. Kramer: LDS-themed blogger seeking socio-cultural anthropology doctoral degree
 Louis C. Midgley: BYU — Professor Emeritus of Political Science. Active in LDS apologetics
 Dallin H. Oaks: University of Chicago; BYU (later, LDS Apostle) — Lawyer. American legal history pertaining to Joseph Smith, Jr.
 Nathan B. Oman: William & Mary — Law. Early LDS ecclesiastical jurisprudence
 Steven L. Peck: BYU — Biologist. Author-essayist on various Mormon-themed subjects
 Daniel C. Peterson: BYU — previous professor of Near Eastern studies. Book of Mormon studies
 John W. Welch: BYU — Law. Editor since 1991 of BYU Studies''

References

List
Latter Day Saint movement lists